The Thunder Bay Soroptimist International Friendship Garden is a city park located in the south end of Thunder Bay, Ontario, Canada. The park is located at the south end of Chapples Park, at the corners of Victoria Avenue and Hyde Park Avenue.

The Friendship Garden was organised in 1967 as a Centennial gift by the Soroptimist Club of Fort William-Port Arthur. The garden showcases unique monuments representing eighteen ethnic groups in the Thunder Bay area, laid out in a  garden featuring man made ponds, floral displays, picnic tables, benches and walking trails.

Groups represented in the park

  Canadian
  Chinese
  Croatian
  Dutch
  Filipino
  Finnish

  German
  Greek
  Hungarian
  Indian
  Italian
  Lithuanian

  Polish
  Portuguese
  Scottish
  Slovakian
  Slovenian
  Ukrainian

External links
 Park Information Page
 Thunder Bay City Park's Page
 Photos from the International Friendship Gardens

Parks in Thunder Bay